Joseph Young House is a historic home located in Newlin Township, Chester County, Pennsylvania. The house was built in 1835, and is a two-story, five bay, fieldstone dwelling in a Georgian / Federal style. It has a large, two-story stone rear kitchen and bedroom wing. It has a gable roof and features a central entrance with semi-circular fanlight and dual gable end chimneys with parapets.  Also on the property are a banked milkhouse / smokehouse and four seat, Gothic style outhouse.

It was added to the National Register of Historic Places in 1985.

References

Houses on the National Register of Historic Places in Pennsylvania
Georgian architecture in Pennsylvania
Federal architecture in Pennsylvania
Gothic Revival architecture in Pennsylvania
Houses completed in 1835
Houses in Chester County, Pennsylvania
National Register of Historic Places in Chester County, Pennsylvania